AdaControl is a free (GMGPL) tool that detects the use of various kinds of constructs in Ada programs. Its first goal is to control proper usage of style or programming rules, but it can also be used as a powerful tool to search for use (or non-use) of various forms of programming styles or design patterns. Searched elements range from very simple, like the occurrence of certain entities, declarations, or statements, to very sophisticated, like verifying that certain programming patterns are being obeyed.

History 
The development of AdaControl by Adalog started in 2004, under a contract of Eurocontrol, which developed the CFMU (Central Flow Management Unit), a million+ lines of code program  (in Ada) to manage Air Traffic over Europe. Only automated tools could verify compliance of a program of that size to programming standards.

Since Eurocontrol had no interest in commercializing software, it was decided to release AdaControl as free software. This had the benefit of helping the Ada community at large, and at the same time, allowed Eurocontrol to enjoy further improvements made by the community. Later, other companies sponsored further development, creating a virtual consortium effect.

Features 

AdaControl applies a set of controls to a set of Ada units. A control is defined by a rule (and possibly a subrule) with appropriate parameters. Controls (as well as various commands used to adjust the behaviour of the program) are provided directly from the command line, from a file, or interactively. 

There is a wide range of controls available. As of current version(1.22r16c), there are 591 tests that can be performed by AdaControl. The number increases with each new release.

In addition, AdaControl provides suggestions of fixes for a number of violations. When AdaControl is launched from the GPS environment, the fixes can be performed by clicking on an icon, just like for compiler messages. A companion tool can also apply all suggested fixes automatically.

Adacontrol is written in Ada, using ASIS for syntactic and semantic analysis. This gives the tool the same level of language accuracy as the underlying compiler.

Great care has been taken to make the tool easily extensible by the user.

References

External links 

 Adalog website
 Adalog website

Static program analysis tools
Free computer programming tools